Drive By is the seventh album by Australian improvised music trio The Necks first released on the Fish of Milk label in 2003 and later on the ReR label internationally. The album features a single hour-long track, titled "Drive By", performed by Chris Abrahams, Lloyd Swanton and Tony Buck.

Reception
The Guardian review likened the album to "an hour-long ride through William Gibson territory in a sleek limo, blurred shapes barely visible through the tinted windows" and that The Necks "have created a method of performing that transcends style while retaining meaning - in the most stylish way possible". The album won the ARIA Music Awards Best Jazz album in 2004.

Track listing
 "Drive By" (The Necks) - 60:16

Personnel
Chris Abrahams – piano
Lloyd Swanton – bass
Tony Buck – drums

References

2003 albums
ARIA Award-winning albums
The Necks albums